There are a number of elementary schools named Taft Elementary School:

Taft Elementary School (Orange, California)
Taft Elementary School (Santa Ana, California)
Taft Elementary School (Boise, Idaho)
Taft Elementary School (Wyoming, Michigan) 
Taft Elementary School (Ashland, Ohio)
Taft Elementary School (Taft, Oregon)
Taft Elementary School (Uxbridge, Massachusetts)
Taft Elementary School (Washingtonville, New York)